Stringer (pronounced to rhyme with "ringer") is an English occupational surname and occasionally used as a given name. It originally denoted a maker of rope or strings, and especially those for the famous English longbows used for both hunting and war. It is based on an agent derivative of the Old English streng, meaning "string," which is in turn based on the Old Norse strengr. In Yorkshire, where it is still particularly common, George Redmonds argues that the surname may have been connected with ironworking, a stringer having operated some form of specialist hearth.

Early examples of the surname recorded in authentic registers and charters of the medieval period include:
Roger le Strenger in 1293, Yorkshire;
Lady Godwyna Strenger in 1328, Somerset;
Richard Stringer, in 1679, a footsoldier of Barbados.

The first recorded spelling of the family name is believed to be that of Walter Stringere, which was dated 1194, in the Curia Regis Rolls for Wiltshire.

List of people

Surname
 Ahren Stringer, bassist and vocalist in the Australian band The Amity Affliction
 Alex J. Stringer, Canadian politician 
 Arlene Stringer-Cuevas (1933-2020), American politician
 C. Vivian Stringer, Rutgers University women's basketball head coach
 Jake Stringer, Australian rules footballer for Essendon
 Chris Stringer, British anthropologist 
 Dave Stringer, English former player and manager of the Norwich City football club 
 Gary Stringer, member of Reef (band)   
 George Stringer, English recipient of the Victoria Cross in World War I  
 Jesse Stringer, Australian rules footballer for Geelong
 Jimmy Stringer, English footballer
 Graham Stringer, British Member of Parliament
 Howard Stringer, Chief Executive Officer of Sony Corporation
 John Bentley Stringer, British computer pioneer
 Korey Stringer, National Football League player who died of heat stroke during training camp
 Lee Stringer, American writer and editor 
 Lew Stringer, English comic artist and scriptwriter
 Michael Stringer John Michael Stringer (1924–2004), film production designer
 Nick Stringer, English actor  
 Peter Stringer, Irish rugby union footballer
 Scott Stringer (born 1960), American politician, 2021 mayoral candidate for New York City
 Vickie Stringer, American novelist
 Walter Stringer Sir Thomas Walter Stringer (1855–1944), New Zealand judge

Given name
 Stringer Davis (1896–1973), English actor
 Stringer Lawrence (1697–1775), English soldier of the East India Company

Fictional characters
 Marty Stringer, played by John Michael Higgins in Evan Almighty
 Mr. Stringer, the part that Davis played alongside his wife Margaret Rutherford in four Miss Marple films
 Stringer Bell, a fictional character on The Wire, whose name is a  composite of two real Baltimore criminals', Stringer Reed and Roland Bell

See also
Stringer (disambiguation)
Strenger

References 

English-language surnames
Occupational surnames
English-language occupational surnames

fr:Stringer